Pastorale heroica is a 1983 Polish war film directed by Henryk Bielski. It was entered into the 13th Moscow International Film Festival, where Wirgiliusz Gryń won the award for Best Actor.

Cast
 Wirgiliusz Gryń
 Teresa Lipowska as Chudzina

References

External links
 

1983 films
1980s war films
Polish war films
1980s Polish-language films